People of the Sea (German: Menschen am Meer) is a 1925 German silent drama film directed by Léo Lasko and starring Fritz Kampers, Elisabeth Pinajeff and Fritz Rasp.

Cast
 Fritz Kampers
 Elisabeth Pinajeff
 Ernst Pröckl
 Fritz Rasp
 Grete Reinwald

References

Bibliography
 Bock, Hans-Michael & Bergfelder, Tim. The Concise CineGraph. Encyclopedia of German Cinema. Berghahn Books, 2009.

External links

1925 films
Films of the Weimar Republic
German silent feature films
Films directed by Léo Lasko
German black-and-white films
German drama films
1925 drama films
Silent drama films
1920s German films
1920s German-language films